Herman Rechberger (14 February 1947 – 11 January 2022) was an Austria-born Finnish composer, conductor and musician.

Life and career 
Born in Linz, Allied-occupied Austria, Rechberger studied classical guitar at the Bruckner-Konservatorium in his hometown and later continued his musical studies in Zurich and at the Brussels Conservatory. In 1970 he moved to Finland to attend the  Sibelius Academy in Helsinki, graduating in recorder, guitar and composition. He was granted citizenship in 1974, and after working for a few years as a music teacher he worked at the  Finnish Broadcasting Company as a music journalist, a producer of contemporary music and as director of Yle Experimental Studio.  

Rechberger's compositions spanned different genres, including operas, symphonies, happenings, sonic sculptures, electronic music, orchestral compositions as well as reconstructions of ancient music.

He died on 11 January 2022, at the age of 74.

References

External links
 
 
 

1947 births
2022 deaths 
Finnish composers
Austrian emigrants to Finland
People from Linz
Recorder players
Sibelius Academy alumni
Anton Bruckner Private University alumni
Royal Conservatory of Brussels alumni